Casa famiglia (Family home) is an Italian television series that aired from April 20, 2001 to May 30, 2003 on Rai 1. The series, a spin-off of the series Un prete tra noi (A priest among us), follows Don Marco (Massimo Dapporto) taking over the responsibilities of his family home from his ailing father.

Cast
 Massimo Dapporto: Don Marco
 Ettore Bassi: Andrea
 Arnoldo Foà: Padre Marcello
 Violante Placido: Giulia
 Massimo Poggio: Attilio
 Marco Beretta: Pietro
 Eljana Popova: Marinetta
 Remo Remotti: Luigi
 Adriano Pantaleo: Marmitta
 Ciro Esposito: Carlo 
 Nina Soldano: Benedetta  
 Aisha Cerami: Carmen

See also
List of Italian television series

External links
 

Italian television series
2001 Italian television series debuts
2003 Italian television series endings
2000s Italian television series
RAI original programming